Grades (born Daniel Traynor) is an English producer, songwriter and DJ based in London. His music encompasses elements of R&B, Hip Hop, 2step, House and Electronic.

Career
As an artist/DJ, Grades’ first original track "Freedom" was released in April 2014 and was featured by Annie Mac in her Free Music Mondays download series. He followed the release of "Freedom" with a remix of Lana Del Rey’s "West Coast" which reached number 3 at Hype Machine. Grades’ second single "Owe It To Yourself" was premiered in June by Mixmag who compared him to artists such as Bondax and Kaytranada. Grades went on to remix Hot Natured, Ellie Goulding, Labrinth, Becky Hill, Lianne La Havas & many more.

Later in the year, Grades co-wrote & produced Bastille’s single "Torn Apart" which featured on the "Vs. (Other People’s Heartache pt. III)" project.  His third single "Crocodile Tears", featuring vocals from songwriter Caroline Ailin, was premiered by Vice’s music channel Noisey.

Grades has received radio play from Zane Lowe, Pete Tong, MistaJam, Nick Grimshaw, Huw Stephens and Annie Mac at BBC Radio 1, and had his own KISS FM radio show from 2016-17.

Within 2016, he began working with NAO on her debut studio album For All We Know (including "Bad Blood", "Fool To Love" & "Girlfriend") produced and featured on Sinead Harnett's "If You Let Me", and co-wrote a song ft. Mr Hudson on DJ Snake's number 1 Billboard album Encore. He produced Julian Peretta's "I Cry" which was #3 most played song on French radio during 2016.

Grades went on to work on tracks for H.E.R, Tinie Tempah, Tinashe, Aanysa, Snakehips as well as Dua Lipa & Khalid on their multi-platinum albums.

Grades was nominated for a Grammy in 2017 for his work on the Khalid album American Teen, alongside producer Scribz Riley.

Discography

Singles

as lead artist
 "I Wanna Be Down" (2014) 
 "Rock The Boat" (2014) 
 "Torn Apart" (2014) 
 "Freedom" (2014)
 "Owe It To Yourself" (2014)
 "Crocodile Tears" (2014)
 "King" (2015)

as featured artist
 "If You Let Me" (2016)

Songwriting and production credits

References

External links
Interview with Ministry of Sound
Interview with HungerTV

Living people
Year of birth missing (living people)
English DJs
DJs from London